The substantia ferruginea is an underlying patch of deeply pigmented nerve cells located in the floor of the superior part of the sulcus limitans.

It was coined in 1838 and 1851.

See also
 Rhomboid fossa
 Sulcus limitans
 Locus ceruleus
 Fourth ventricle

References

External links
Atlas Image of the Posterior View of the Floor of Fourth Ventricle
substantia ferruginea from MedicineWord

Brainstem